Central Christian Church may refer to:

in Singapore
Central Christian Church, Singapore, in Punggol

in the United States (by state then city)
Central Christian Church (Indianapolis, Indiana), in Marion County, Indiana
Central Christian Church (Lexington, Kentucky), listed on the NRHP in Fayette County, Kentucky
Central Christian Church (Henderson, Nevada), in the Las Vegas Valley
Central Christian Church (Enterprise, Nevada), in the Las Vegas Valley
Central Christian Church (Austin, Texas), listed on the NRHP in Travis County, Texas
Central Christian Church (Dallas, Texas)
Central Christian Church (Greenville, Texas), listed on the NRHP in Travis County, Texas